There Goes Rhymin' Simon is the third solo studio album by American musician Paul Simon released on May 5, 1973.  It contains songs spanning several styles and genres, such as gospel ("Loves Me Like a Rock") and Dixieland ("Take Me to the Mardi Gras"). It received two nominations at the Grammy Awards of 1974, which were for Best Pop Vocal Performance, Male and Album of the Year.

As foreshadowed by the lead single "Kodachrome" (which reached No. 2 on the Billboard charts, behind Billy Preston's "Will It Go Round in Circles"), There Goes Rhymin' Simon was a bigger hit than its predecessor, reaching No. 2 on the Billboard 200 chart (behind George Harrison's Living in the Material World), and No. 1 on Cashbox for one week from June 30, 1973. In the United Kingdom, the album peaked at No. 4. Subsequent singles were also the No. 2 single "Loves Me Like a Rock" (kept out of the top spot by Cher's "Half-Breed", but reaching No. 1 on Cashbox on September 29, 1973), and the Top 40 hit "American Tune". Also, "Take Me to the Mardi Gras" was released in the UK reaching the Top 10.

The song "Kodachrome" is named after the Kodak film of the same name.  Kodak required the album to note that Kodachrome is a trademark. The song was not released as a single in Britain, where it could not be played on BBC radio due to its trademarked name.

Reception 

Critics praised the album. The Denver Posts Jared Johnson called it "a brilliantly executed masterpiece, and surely the finest album in three years," citing such 1970 releases as Bridge Over Troubled Water and After the Gold Rush. Robert Hilburn of the Los Angeles Times said, "Combining a variety of musical textures (from a touch of gospel to an infectious trace of Jamaican rhythm to a hint of the old Simon and Garfunkel grandeur), Simon's new album firmly establishes him as one of our most valuable and accessible artists." Stephen Holden of Rolling Stone praised the album as "a rich and moving song cycle, one in which each cut reflects on every other to create an ever-widening series of refractions."

However, Stereo Reviews Noel Coppage, while giving the album an "excellent" rating, nonetheless felt that it was "deficient in spontaneity, excitement, strain", calling its arrangements "clean and sensible" but "oddly predictable".

In 2003, the album was ranked number 267 on Rolling Stone magazine's list of the 500 greatest albums of all time.

In 2000 it was voted number 421 in Colin Larkin's All Time Top 1000 Albums.

Track listing 
All tracks written by Paul Simon.

Personnel 
 Paul Simon – vocals, acoustic guitar (1, 3, 4, 6-10)
 Barry Beckett – keyboards (1, 3, 9), acoustic piano (5), vibraphone (9)
 Paul Griffin – acoustic piano (2)
 Bob James – keyboards (4, 6)
 Bobby Scott – acoustic piano (4)
 Carson Whitsett – Hammond organ (8)
 Pete Carr – acoustic guitar (1), electric guitar (3, 5, 9)
 Jimmy Johnson – electric guitar (1, 3)
 Cornell Dupree – electric guitar (2)
 Al Gafa – guitar (4)
 David Spinozza – guitar (4)
Jerry Puckett – electric guitar (8)
 David Hood – bass guitar (1, 3, 5, 9, 10)
 Gordon Edwards – bass guitar (2)
 Bob Cranshaw – bass guitar (4, 6, 7)
 Richard Davis – double bass (4)
 Verne Robbins – bass guitar (8)
 Roger Hawkins – drums (1, 3, 5, 10), percussion (9)
 Rick Marotta – drums (2)
 James Stroud – drums (8)
 Grady Tate – drums (4, 6)
 Don Elliott – vibraphone (4)
 Airto Moreira – percussion (7)
 Uncredited – horns (1, 8), Hammond organ (2), strings (3), flute (4), shaker (4), choir (5)
 Onward Brass Band – horns (3)
 Allen Toussaint – horn arrangements (2)
 Quincy Jones – string arrangements (4)
 Del Newman – string arrangements (6)
 The Dixie Hummingbirds – group vocals (2, 10)
 Claude Jeter – falsetto vocals (3)
 Maggie and Terre Roche – backing vocals (7)

Production 
 Paul Simon – producer, arrangements 
 The Muscle Shoals Rhythm Section – co-producers (1, 3, 5, 9, 10)
 Roy Halee – co-producer (2, 7), engineer (2, 7)
 Paul Samwell-Smith – co-producer (6)
 Jerry Masters – supervising engineer, engineer (1, 3, 5, 7, 9, 10)
 Phil Ramone – supervising engineer, engineer (2, 4-7, 10), co-producer (4, 7, 8, 10)
 Roger Quested – engineer (6)
 Gerald Stephenson – engineer (8)
 Richard Blakin – assistant engineer 
 Milton Glaser – cover design

Charts

Weekly charts

Year-end charts

Certifications

References 

1973 albums
Paul Simon albums
Albums arranged by Quincy Jones
Albums produced by Roy Halee
Albums produced by Phil Ramone
Albums produced by Paul Samwell-Smith
Albums produced by Paul Simon
Columbia Records albums
Warner Records albums
Albums recorded at Morgan Sound Studios
Albums recorded at Muscle Shoals Sound Studio
Albums with cover art by Milton Glaser